Lygodactylus mirabilis is a species of gecko endemic to Madagascar.

References

Lygodactylus
Reptiles described in 1962
Reptiles of Madagascar
Endemic fauna of Madagascar